Post-traumatic embitterment disorder (PTED) is defined as a pathological reaction to a negative life event, which those affected experienced as a grave insult, humiliation, betrayal, or injustice. Prevalent emotions of PTED are embitterment, anger, fury, and hatred, especially against the triggering stressor, often accompanied by fantasies of revenge. The disorder commences immediately and without time delay at the moment of the triggering event. If left untreated, the prognosis of PTED presents as rather unfavorable, since patients find themselves trapped in a vicious circle of strong negative emotions constantly intensifying one another and eventually leading into a self-destructive downward spiral. People affected by PTED are more likely to put fantasies of revenge into action, making them a serious threat to the stressor.

The concept of PTED as a distinct clinical disorder has been first described by the German psychiatrist and psychologist Michael Linden in 2003, who remains its most involved researcher. Even though it has been backed up by empirical research in the past years, it remains disputed as to whether embitterment should be included among psychological disorders. Therefore, PTED currently does not hold its own category in the ICD-10 but is categorized under F43.8 “Other reactions to severe stress”. It cannot be categorized as an adjustment disorder under F43.2, since “ordinary” adjustment disorders normally subside within six months, while PTED is much more likely to become chronic. A condition similar to PTED has already been described by Emil Kraepelin as early as 1915 by the name querulous paranoia as a form of traumatic neuroses, explicitly demarcating it from personality disorders.

Bitterness and embitterment 
Bitterness (also called resentment) is defined as a basic human reaction in response to experiences of injustice, betrayal, or humiliation, consisting of emotions such as anger, wrath, hostility, disappointment, disgust, and shame. However, while “ordinary” bitterness is just a transient emotion, which will eventually fade away, embitterment is described as a much more prolonged state of bitterness, which will not easily subside and can severely impair the quality of life of those affected and of their environment. Typically, embitterment will flare up time and time again upon recalling the triggering incident.

Prevalance 
Preliminary data suggest a prevalence of about 2–3% in the general population. Increased prevalence rates are observed when larger groups of people are subject to social upheaval. Accordingly, Linden described this condition for the first time after the German reunification.

Causes 
Severe reactions of embitterment can be triggered if someone’s core beliefs are being heavily violated. In psychology, core beliefs are defined as mindsets, opinions, and values, which define an individual. They function as a cognitive reference system which structures the perception of the world, of oneself, of others, of what is important or not, what is right or wrong, and what is necessary to be done, and can involve both negative and positive feelings. They are of great individual and social importance and can be handed down transgenerationally, thereby shaping entire cultures. Core beliefs are not necessarily true in view of reality, but they feel true to an individual, no matter what they consist of. Therefore, information contradicting them is commonly ignored, making them difficult to change or challenge.

Since core beliefs are a central aspect of an individual's identity, they are especially vulnerable to insults, humiliations, betrayal, and injustice, which are psychologically perceived as aggressions. PTED can be triggered if a violation of a core belief, especially a positive one, is too severe to be ignored and to be properly processed, and if there is no way for those affected to fight back and defend their beliefs, leaving them in a state of helplessness, resignation and eventually embitterment. As core beliefs are unique for every individual, what might seem like a triviality or just a minor nuisance to one person, can cause an existential crisis in another one, especially if they lack the psychological resilience to overcome the crisis.

Symptoms and diagnostic criteria 
A. Essential criteria:

 clinically significant emotional symptoms or behavioral problems, starting immediately after exactly one singular negative, stressful life event, which – from the outside – appears to be no more than an everyday occurrence (i. e. nothing out of the ordinary like road accidents, robberies, or war)
 patient is aware of the triggering event and has identified it as the cause of the disorder
 triggering event is experienced as unjust, humiliating and/or insulting
 recurring intrusive thoughts of the triggering event
 patients reacts with emotional arousal upon recalling the triggering event
B. Additional symptoms:

 dysphoric-aggressive-depressive mood; mood appears similar to Major depressive disorder with Somatic symptom disorder
 unimpaired affect regulation when distracted
 Avolition
 patient sees himself as victim
 patient sees himself as helpless and unable to overcome the triggering event or its cause
 self-blame for not having prevented the triggering event or for being unable to cope with it
 indifference in view of own health
 unspecific somatic symptoms (e. g. insomnia, loss of appetite, pain)
 phobic avoidance of persons or places related to the triggering event
 weariness of life and suicidal ideation
 recurring fantasies of revenge and aggressive thoughts towards the stressor, sometimes including fantasies of murder or murder-suicide
 querulous persistence in the fight for the restoration of justice

C. no signs of a psychological disorder in the year prior to the triggering event, which could explain the abnormal reaction; no recrudescence into previous psychological disorder

D. clinically significant impairment or strain on own condition, and social, occupational, or other important spheres of life

E. symptoms have been persisting for at least six months since the moment of the triggering event

PTED does not present as “traumatic” in view of its preceding trigger, but because of its chronological course of events: Minutes prior to the triggering event, those affected were perfectly healthy, minutes later they are ill and severely impaired. In this regard PTED resembles PTSD. However, the nature of the triggering event in PTED has little influence on the nature of the ensuing symptoms.

PTED will not subside on its own but rather intensify over time, leading patients into a self-destructive downward spiral of negative emotions constantly reinforcing one another. If left untreated, PTED is very likely to eventually lead those affected into implementing their aggressions towards the stressor, thereby committing the most serious felonies.

Diagnosis

BEI 
The Berner Embitterment-Inventory (BEI) (Znoj, 2008; 2011) measures emotional embitterment, performance-related embitterment, pessimism/hopelessness, and misanthropy/aggression.

PTED scale 
The PTED scale is a 19 item self-rating questionnaire and can be used to identify reactive embitterment and assess the severity of PTED. Answers are given on a five-point Likert scale. An average score of 2.5 identifies with a clinically relevant degree of embitterment response, though it does not officially confirm a diagnosis. Higher values are only indications of critical embitterment. The diagnosis of PTED is only possible through a detailed clinical assessment or standardized diagnostic interview.

Standardized diagnostic interview 
The standardized diagnostic interview of PTED asks for core criteria of PTED. In the diagnostic interview, it must be clarified what the patient means when they describe their experiences and feelings.

Differential diagnoses 

 Post-traumatic stress disorder:
 triggered by one singular or several potentially life-threatening, uncommon events causing extreme fear and panic (e. g. road accidents, robberies, war)
 cardinal emotion is recurring or persisting fear; embitterment does not occur
 Major depressive disorder:
 very common misdiagnosis due to several symptomatic similarities (e. g. depressed mood, avolition, suicidality, absent-mindedness)
 contrary to PTED no direct temporal connection to debilitating events, no singular stressor
 no anhedonia in PTED patients
 Adjustment disorder:
 normally subsides within six months after the triggering event
 can be caused by a number of events, not necessarily by insults, betrayal, humiliation or injustice
 Phobia:
 Avoidance behavior caused by fear, not by embitterment
 Personality disorders:
 Lifelong development, no immediate connection to a singular event
 PTED completely reversible by therapy, effects of PDs only mitigable
 Development of PTED might be facilitated by existing PDs
 Paranoia, delusions, schizotypal disorder, schizophrenia, querulant delusion, moral injury

Psychotherapy 
The treatment of posttraumatic bitterness is complicated by the typical resignative-aggressive-defensive attitude of the patient, which is also directed against therapeutic offers. One approach of treatment is wisdom therapy developed by Linden, a form of cognitive-behavioral therapy that aims to empower the patient to distance themselves from the critical life event and build up new life perspectives.
One uses the usual cognitive strategies of attitude change and problem-solving are used, such as:
 behavior therapeutic methods like behavioral analysis and cognitive rehearsal
 analysis of automatic thoughts and schemata
 reframing or cognitive reattribution
 exposure treatments
 increase of activities
 rebuilding of social contacts
promotion of self-effectiveness

A special treatment module aims at the training of wisdom competencies, which means promoting the following abilities:
 changing perspectives
 empathy
 perception and acceptance of emotions
 emotional balance and sense of humour
 contextualism
 long-term orientation
 value relativism
 tolerance of uncertainty
 self-distance and self-relativization

Methodically, the method of "insolvable problems" is used. In this procedure, fictitious serious and insolvable conflict situations are presented, which allow the patients to train wisdom capacities and transfer them to their own situation (so-called "learning transfer.")

Criticism 
The problem of embitterment reactions and also the post-traumatic embitterment disorder increasingly gain international attention.
Nevertheless, there are some unsolved problems. Further research is needed to differentiate between PTED and other mental disorders. In 2014 science journalist Jörg Blech mentioned this disorder in his book Die Psychofalle - Wie die Seelenindustrie uns zu Patienten macht ("The Psycho Trap: How the Soul Industry Makes Us Patients"). It is discussed whether the introduction of PTED may make a problem out of everyday problems. However, according to the available studies, the primary problem is not the differentiation between healthy and ill persons, since patients with PTED have regularly been given a variety of diagnoses. It is about the differential diagnostic differentiation of a special type of disorder, as a precondition for a goal-oriented therapy.

Bibliography

References 

Types of mental disorders